Erkin Rakishev is a prolific Kazakh film director. He was working on a now canceled and unauthorized film sequel to Borat titled My Brother, Borat. It was supposed to be a comedy intended to portray Kazakhstan in a more favorable and realistic light than Sacha Baron Cohen's film.

References

External links
 Director Makes 'Real' Film in Revenge for 'Borat', AOL News, October 5, 2010
 Kazakh filmmaker shooting 'Borat' redoux, The Jerusalem Post, November 24, 2010
 Production of unofficial Borat revenge sequel underway in Kazakhstan, New York Daily News, October 25, 2010

Living people
Kazakhstani film directors
Year of birth missing (living people)